Headline is a 1944 British thriller film directed by John Harlow and starring David Farrar, Anne Crawford, William Hartnell and John Stuart. It was based on the 1933 novel Reporter! by Ken Attiwill. Its plot involves a crime reporter who searches for a mystery woman who has witnessed a murder. It was shot at the Riverside Studios in Hammersmith. The film's sets were designed by the art director James Carter.

Cast

References

Bibliography
 Goble, Alan. The Complete Index to Literary Sources in Film. Walter de Gruyter, 1999.

External links

1944 films
British thriller films
1940s thriller films
Films directed by John Harlow
British black-and-white films
Films about journalists
Films shot at Riverside Studios
Films based on Australian novels
Films scored by Percival Mackey
1940s English-language films
1940s British films